Clubul Sportiv Municipal București, also known as CSM București, CSM or CSM Bucharest, is a women's handball team based in Bucharest, Romania, that competes in the Liga Naţională and the EHF Champions League.

Founded in 2007, the club has traditionally worn a blue kit since inception. The team has played its home matches in the 5,300-capacity Polyvalent Hall in the Tineretului Park in southern Bucharest.

CSM București established itself as a major force in both Romanian and European handball in the late 2010s, winning EHF Champions League in its debut season and reaching the Final Four three consecutive times. This success was replicated in the league, where the club won four consecutive times.

The official CSM mascot is a "tiger". CSM Bucharest is one of the most widely supported handball clubs in Romania.

History

Early years
CSM București was formed in 2007 by the General Council of Bucharest, as part of the program to promote handball among capital's youth. The team played in the second division of Romania for two seasons without notable results. At the end of the 2008–2009 season, Rapid București experienced financial problems and eleven of their players along with coach Vasile Mărgulescu, moved to CSM. Benefiting from the experience of several new players, the club won all its Divizia A matches and promoted to the Liga Națională.

Since 2010, CSM Bucharest were a constant presence of the Liga Națională, and finished third in their debut season, after Oltchim Vâlcea and Universitatea Cluj-Napoca. The team made European debut playing in the 2011–2012 season of the EHF Cup, where they reached the Round of 16 but unfortunately being eventually beaten by Romanian HC Zalău. In the following two seasons they played in the Liga Națională without significant results.

First national title (2015)
Mărgulescu was fired after a poor start in 2014 and replaced with Mette Klit. The ambitious board aimed to win the Liga Națională next season, wanting to become even a threat to win the Champions League. In the spring of 2014, four Brazilian World Championship winners (Mayssa Pessoa, Ana Paula Rodrigues, Deonise Cavaleiro and Fernanda da Silva), plus 2014 European Championship's stars Carmen Martín and Linnea Torstenson, signed contracts at CSM. A strong squad was filled with local talent including Oana Manea, Iulia Curea or Talida Tolnai.

The club hosted first edition of Bucharest Trophy in preseason. The hosts took the home advantage to win the final against Champions League Runners-Up ŽRK Budućnost.

The Tigresses won their first eight matches of the season before losing to title rivals HCM Baia Mare. But at the second part of the season, CSM took revenge on Baia Mare with 29–23 win in Bucharest. They secured a spot in the playoffs and second place in the regular season. Eventually, they won 6 consecutive games, earning gold medal. CSM București beat HCM Baia Mare in both legs of the Championship Play Off Final. Previously they defeated HC Dunărea Brăila and Corona Braşov.

EHF Champions League triumph and domination in Romania (2016–)
By winning the national title, CSM qualified automatically for the groups of the 2015–16 EHF Champions League edition. Once again, the club makes another number of top transfers including Isabelle Gulldén, Romanian legend Aurelia Brădeanu and Danish duo Line Jørgensen and Maria Fisker.

Between 20 and 23 August, Bucharest hosted in preseason the second Bucharest Trophy event and grabbed a second consecutive title by defeating Corona Braşov, ŽRK Vardar and ŽRK Budućnost in the final. In September 2015, Mette Klit was replaced in CSM, her Danish fellow Kim Rasmussen taking over.

Under Rasmussen, The Tigresses attained a  milestone of 25 consecutive league victories. A second championship was won in April 2016. In 2016, CSM won the treble winning all the country titles, including the Cup and the Supercup (both against HCM Roman).

CSM București made Champions League debut playing against ŽRK Budućnost, IK Sävehof and SPR Lublin SSA in the group stage. Four wins over the opponents from Sweden and Poland, as well the Montenegro draw, secured second place. Into the main round, CSM bothered by injury. Győri Audi ETO KC and ŽRK Vardar defeated CSM but the team reached the knockout phase where the Romanian side beat undefeated Rostov-Don twice in the quarterfinals.

At the continent finals, in May 2016, București qualified for Final 4 finals for the first time after a semifinal victory over ŽRK Vardar, winning 27–21. On 8 May, CSM București won their title beating Győri Audi ETO KC in the final after a nail-biting penalty shootout. Playmaker Isabelle Gulldén scored 15 goals for CSM and finished as Europe's top scorer, whilst Aurelia Brădeanu scored the final spot-kick. Goalkeeper Jelena Grubišić was named Finals MVP. CSM regained the trophy for Romania after a 52-year break.

Kits

Honours

Domestic competitions

 Liga Națională
 Winners: 2014–15, 2015–16, 2016–17, 2017–18, 2020–21
 Second place: 2018–19, 2021–22
 Third place: 2011
 Cupa României
 Winners: 2016, 2017, 2018, 2019, 2022
 Finalist: 2015, 2020, 2021
 Supercupa României
 Winners: 2016, 2017, 2019, 2022
 Finalist: 2015, 2018, 2020, 2021

European competitions
 EHF Champions League:
 Winners: 2015–16
 Third place: 2016–17, 2017–18

Other competitions
 Bucharest Trophy
 Winners – record: 2014, 2015

European record

Team

Current squad
Squad for the 2022–23 season

Goalkeepers
1  Laura Glauser 
 12  Marie Davidsen
 16  Evelina Eriksson
Left Wings
 21  Alexandra Dindiligan
 28  Siraba Dembélé
Right Wings
2  Mihaela Mihai
6  Malin Aune
 51  Marina Sudakova
Line Players
 49  Andreea Ailincăi
 66  Ema Alivodić
 77  Crina Pintea

Left Backs
3  Emilie Hegh Arntzen
8  Cristina Neagu (c)
 10  Ștefania Stoica
 14  Kalidiatou Niakaté 
Centre Backs
9  Grâce Zaadi
 17  Elizabeth Omoregie 
 99  Andreea Rotaru
Right Backs   
7  Alicia Gogîrlă
 15  Andrea Klikovac

Transfers
Transfers for the season 2023–24

 Joining
 Jennifer Gutiérrez (LW) (from  Rapid București)
 Monika Kobylińska (RB) (from  Brest Bretagne Handball)
 Trine Østergaard (RW) (from  SG BBM Bietigheim)
 Vilde Ingstad (P) (from  Team Esbjerg)
 Laura Flippes (RB) (from  Paris 92)

 Leaving
 Siraba Dembélé (LW) (retires)
 Andrea Klikovac (RB) (retires)
 Ema Alivodić (P) (unknown destination)
 Malin Aune (RW) (to  Odense Håndbold)
 Kalidiatou Niakaté (LB) (to  ŽRK Budućnost Podgorica)
 Alicia Gogîrlă (RB) (to  SCM Râmnicu Vâlcea)

Personnel

Current technical staff

Board members
{| class="wikitable"
|-
!Office
!Name 
|- 
| Team Manager
| Cristina Vărzaru
|- 
| Director operational
| Vlad Enăchescu
|-
| Competition organiser
| Ionuț Bugan
|-
| Marketing communications
| Ionuț Aron - Deputy General Manager

Selected former players

  Paula Ungureanu (2016–2019)
  Oana Manea (2014–2019)
  Cristina Vărzaru (2012–2017)
  Aurelia Brădeanu (2015–2017)
  Iulia Curea (2014–2020)
  Talida Tolnai (2014–2015)
  Patricia Vizitiu (2014–2015)
  Mihaela Tivadar  (2014–2015)
  Denisa Dedu (2019–2021)
  Crina Pintea (2019–2021)
  Fernanda da Silva (2014–2016)
  Deonise Fachinello (2014–2015)
  Ana Paula Belo (2014–2016)
  Mayssa Pessoa (2014–2016)
  Eduarda Amorim (2022)
  Samara da Silva (2022)
  Isabelle Gulldén (2015–2018)
  Linnea Torstensson (2014–2017, 2019–2020)
  Nathalie Hagman (2017–2019)
  Sabina Jacobsen (2017–2019)
  Nora Mørk (2019–2020)
  Marit Malm Frafjord (2017–2018)
  Amanda Kurtović (2017–2019)
  Malin Aune (2021–2023)
  Siraba Dembélé (2020–2023)
  Camille Ayglon-Saurina (2016–2018)
  Gnonsiane Niombla (2016–2018)
  Tess Wester (2021–2022)
  Yvette Broch (2021–2022)
  Martine Smeets (2020–2022)
  Jovanka Radičević (2018–2019)
  Majda Mehmedović (2016–2019)
  Andrea Klikovac (2019–2023)
  Maria Fisker (2015–2016)
  Line Jørgensen (2015–2018)
  Andrea Lekić (2018–2020)
  Dragana Cvijić (2018–2021)
  Carmen Martín (2014–2017, 2019–2022)
  Alexandrina Cabral (2020–2021)
  Jelena Grubišić (2015-2022)
  Barbara Lazović (2018–2019, 2020–2022)
  Anastasia Lobach (2016–2018)
  Ekaterina Vetkova (2014–2016)
  Iryna Glibko (2013–2015)

Kit manufacturers and shirt sponsors

European competitions

Pld – Played; W – Won; D – Drawn; L – Lost; GF – Goals for; GA – Goals against; Diff – Difference.

EHF Champions League

Green – Win; Yellow – Draw; Red – Lost.

Domestic competitions

Pos – Position; Pld – Played; W – Won; D – Drawn; L – Lost; GF – Goals for; GA – Goals against; Diff – Difference.

Statistics

EHF Champions League Top 10 Goalscorers
(All-time). – Last updated on 12 February 2023

Domestic Competitions Top 10 Goalscorers
(2014-present). – Last update on 18 February 2022

Individual awards in the EHF Champions League

Last updated on 3 June 2022

Coaches

See also
 Universitatea Știința București
 Rapid București
 Romania women's national handball team

References

External links
  

Romanian handball clubs
 
Handball
Handball clubs established in 2007
CSM București (women's handball)
Sport in Bucharest
2007 establishments in Romania